Saaya 2  is a 2022 Pakistani horror drama television series directed by Sami Sani, produced by Erfan Ghanchi. It serves as a sequel to the 2018 drama Saaya.  The drama stars Mashal Khan, Momina Iqbal, Danial Afzal Khan, Naveed Raza in lead roles, whereas Sohail Sameer, Saleem Mairaj, Maham Amir, Mizna Waqas make their comeback from the first season.  The season premiered on 6 May 2022 on Geo Entertainment.

Cast

Main Characters
Maham Amir as Sauleha 
Sohail Sameer as Rashid 
Mashal Khan as Laila aka Pinky; Rashid/Sualeha daughter having feelings for Feroz unaware of the fact that he's jinn
Momina Iqbal as Guriya; Rashid/Sualeha daughter
Hareem Sohail as Laiba; Sajid/Ghana daughter
Danial Afzal Khan as Feroze; a jinn who falls in love with Laila
Naveed Raza as Talal; a blind exorcist helping Rashid's family to deal with Jinn
Inaya Khan as Sidra; Raheela's third daughter who likes Hassaan and is jealous of his relation with Guriya
Haris Waheed as Ahsan; Rashid's nephew who is adamant to marry Guriya
Mizna Waqas as Raheela
Saleem Mairaj as Shams; a spiritual scholar

Supporting Characters
Shahzar Sani as Shariq; Rashid/Saba son
Maria Naqvi as Ghana; Sajid's widow who has brought up and taken care of Rashid's children Guriya, Pinky and Shariq along with her own daughter Laiba
Wajiha Khan as Laraib; Raheela eldest daughter
Benazir Khan as Manahil; Raheela second daughter
Esha Usman as Shafaq; Raheela youngest daughter
Asim Mehmood as Hassan; Guriya's fiance and love interest
Ayesha Khan as Rafia; Hassan's mother
Hammad Shoaib as Arib; Hassan's brother doing specialization in London
Naina as Vishal; Hassan's sister
Sabiha Hashmi as Riffat; Ahsan's grand mother 
Sabahat Ali Bukhari as Naila
Asad Zaman Khan as Shahnawaz
Ruby Butt as Anaya
Jinaan Hussain as Nilofar
Beena Chaudhary as Rabiya
Awais Khalid as Karcha
Anam Tanveer as Dr Areesha
Mehboob Sultan as SHO Abdul Nabi Khokar; police inspector in-charge of investigating Hassaan's murder
Rauf Bhutta as Zaidi
Ibrahim as Rafi
Sami Sani as Baba Sahil
Urooj Kazmi as Noor; maid at Rashid's house who experiences paranormal activities
Fauzia Raj as Samina
Kiran as Shabana
Uzair as Khizar

Guest Appearance
Kiran Tabeer as Saba; Rashid's second wife, appears in flashbacks and memories

References

External Links
Saaya 2 at Har Pal Geo

2022 Pakistani television series debuts
Horror drama television series
Pakistani horror fiction television series